"Drowning in the Sea of Love" is a 1971 song recorded by Joe Simon for Spring Records. It was the title track of his seventh LP, and was the first release from the album. The song was written by Kenny Gamble and Leon Huff.

Chart performance
The single was Simon's fourth of eight U.S. Top 40 hits.  In early 1972, it reached number 11 on the U.S. Billboard Hot 100, and number eight on the Cash Box Top 100. It also reached number three on the R&B chart and became a gold record. Billboard ranked "Drowning in the Sea of Love" as the No. 77 song for 1972.
The song remained Simon's longest-running and highest-charting U.S. single until his 1975 hit, "Get Down, Get Down (Get on the Floor)."

Weekly charts

{|class="wikitable sortable"
|-
!Chart (1971–72)
!Peakposition
|-
|Canada RPM Top Singles
| style="text-align:center;"|50
|-
|U.S. Billboard Hot 100
| style="text-align:center;"|11
|-
|U.S. Billboard Hot Soul Singles
| style="text-align:center;"|3
|-
|U.S. Cash Box Top 100
| style="text-align:center;"|8
|}

Year-end charts

Other Versions
Ronnie Foster recorded a jazz-funk version for his 1972 album Two Headed Freap.
Other notable versions where recorded by Eva Cassidy released on her album American Tune, and Kirk Whalum on his 1995 album In This Life'' .

References

External links
 

1971 singles
Songs written by Leon Huff
1971 songs
Joe Simon (musician) songs
Songs written by Kenny Gamble
Funk songs